The Speedway Grand Prix Challenge or Speedway Grand Prix Qualification is an annual speedway qualifying tournament to determine the qualifiers for the Speedway Grand Prix, which is the World Championship of speedway.

History 
From 1995 the Individual World Championship was replaced by the Grand Prix system. The 17 qualifiers for the 1995 Grand Prix were the top 10 from the 1994 World final, 5 seeds and 2 wildcards. 

From 1996, the leading riders from each Grand Prix series would automatically qualifying for the following year's event. The remaining places would be filled by the leading riders in the Challenge event and qualifiers from the both the Continental Speedway Final and Intercontinental Final. However, the latter two finals would come to end in 2000 and 2001 respectively.

Format and winners

+ Already qualified for the Grand Prix series

See also
 Motorcycle speedway
 Speedway Grand Prix

References 

 
Individual